Ocasio is a Spanish surname found mostly in Puerto Rico. It is ostensibly from the Spanish word "ocasión" meaning "occasion", but its use as a surname is not clear. Notable people with the surname include:

Alexandria Ocasio-Cortez (born 1989), American politician and activist
Bad Bunny (born 1994), real name Benito Martinez-Ocasio, Puerto Rican artist
Asunción Ocasio (born 1987), Puerto Rican taekwondo practitioner
Billy Ocasio, American politician
Cameron Ocasio (born 1999), American actor
Daisy Ocasio (born 1964), Puerto Rican athlete
Karina Ocasio (born 1985), Puerto Rican volleyball player
Ossie Ocasio (born 1955), Puerto Rican boxer
Ramon Ocasio III (born 1962), American judge
Rauw Alejandro (born 1993), real name Raul Alejandro Ruiz-Ocasio, Puerto Rican artist
Aleshia Ocasio (born 1996), Puerto Rican/Black professional softball player

References

Surnames of Puerto Rican origin
Spanish-language surnames